Jeffrey Tayler is a U.S.-born author and journalist. He is the Russia correspondent for the Atlantic Monthly and a contributor to several other magazines as well as to NPR's All Things Considered. He has written several non-fiction books about different regions of the world which include Facing the Congo, Siberian Dawn, Glory in a Camel's Eye, and Angry Wind, the latter being a portrait of a journey through the Muslim portion of black Africa.   River of no Reprieve is about a challenging raft trip down Russia's Lena River. Tayler holds both a Bachelor of Arts degree from Syracuse University, and a Master of Arts degree from the University of Virginia.

Tayler is an accomplished polyglot; in addition to his native English, he is fluent in Russian, Arabic, French, and modern Greek, and has a functioning knowledge of Spanish and Turkish.

He served as a Peace Corps volunteer in Morocco from 1988 to 1990.

Since the summer of 1993, he has lived in Moscow.

Bibliography

Siberian Dawn: A Journey Across the New Russia (2000)
Facing the Congo: A Modern-Day Journey into the Heart of Darkness (2000)
Valley of the Casbahs: A Journey Across the Moroccan Sahara (2003)
Glory in a Camel's Eye: A Perilous Trek Through the Greatest African Desert (2003)
Angry Wind: Through Muslim Black Africa by Truck, Bus, Boat, and Camel (2005) (also published as The Lost Kingdoms of Africa)
River of White Nights: A Siberian Odyssey (2006)
River of No Reprieve: Descending Siberia's Waterway of Exile, Death, and Destiny (2006)
Murderers in Mausoleums: Riding the Back Roads of Empire Between Moscow and Beijing (2009) (also published as In The Bloody Footsteps Of Ghengis Khan: An Epic Journey Across the Steppes, Mountains and Deserts from Red Square to Tiananmen Square)
Topless Jihadis: Inside Femen, the World’s Most Provocative Activist Group (2013)
In Putin's Footsteps: Searching for the Soul of an Empire Across Russia's Eleven Time Zones (2019), with Nina Khrushcheva

References

Year of birth missing (living people)
Living people
American male journalists
The Atlantic (magazine) people
Syracuse University alumni
University of Virginia alumni